Aethiothemis bequaerti is a species of dragonfly in the family Libellulidae. It is found in Angola, Malawi, Nigeria, Zambia, and possibly Mozambique. Its natural habitats are subtropical or tropical moist lowland forests, subtropical or tropical dry shrubland, swamps, and marshes.

References

External links
Aethiothemis bequaerti: Images and occurrence data from GBIF

Libellulidae
Insects described in 1919
Taxa named by Friedrich Ris
Taxonomy articles created by Polbot